Abbott is a former community in Pushmataha County, Oklahoma, United States, 11 miles northeast of Antlers.

Prior to Oklahoma's statehood, Abbott was located in Wade County, a part of the Moshulatubbee District of the Choctaw Nation.

Abbott, Indian Territory was granted a United States Post Office on March 3, 1897; it closed on July 11, 1899. The community, a short-lived boomtown created by the logging industry—which used its rail spur to ship timber via the St. Louis-San Francisco Railway—is no longer in existence.

More information on Abbott may be found in the Pushmataha County Historical Society.

References 

Populated places in Pushmataha County, Oklahoma
Ghost towns in Oklahoma
Logging communities in the United States